Brueelia (formerly spelled Brüelia) is a genus of lice in the family Philopteridae, containing the following species:
 Brueelia amandavae Rekasi & Saxena, 2005
 Brueelia astrildae Tendeiro & Mendes, 1994
 Bureelia cantans Sychra, 2010
 Brueelia eichleri Lakshminarayana, 1969
 Brueelia fasciata Sychra, 2010
 Brueelia lonchurae Tendeiro & Mendes, 1994
 Brueelia munia Ansari
 Brueelia plocea Lakshminarayana
 Brueelia senegala Sychra, 2010
 Brueelia stenozona (Kellogg & Shapman, 1902)

References

Lice